Ernest Richard Remnant (1 May 1881 – 18 March 1969) was an English first-class cricketer. Remnant was a right-handed batsman who bowled slow left-arm orthodox.

Remnant made his first-class debut for Hampshire in 1908 against Surrey. He represented Hampshire in 121 first-class matches from 1908 to 1914, then after the First World War from 1919 to 1921, with his final match for Hampshire coming against Kent at the County Ground, Southampton. In his 121 matches for Hampshire he scored 2,843 runs at a batting average of 17.33, with ten half centuries and a single century of 115 not out against Kent in 1911. With the ball he took 170 wickets at a bowling average of 27.35, with seven five wicket hauls and best figures of 8/61 against Essex in 1921. In the field he took 59 catches for Hampshire.

In the 1915-16 Indian cricket season Remnant played a single first-class match for a side termed "England" against India. The next season he played two first-class matches for the Europeans in the Bombay Quadrangular against the Hindus and against the Parsees in the final, which was drawn.

Remnant stood as an umpire in two first-class matches in 1912 between Hampshire and Oxford University and Hampshire and Leicestershire.

When his first-class career ended he served as the assistant cricket coach at Harrow School. He was also renowned as a fine wood carver; his home in Harrow depicted carved scenes from the Battle of Hastings. Remnant died at Harrow on 18 March 1969.

Family
Remnant's father George Remnant played first-class cricket for Kent.

External links
Ernest Remnant at Cricinfo
Ernest Remnant at CricketArchive
Matches and detailed statistics for Ernest Remnant

1881 births
1969 deaths
English cricketers
Hampshire cricketers
Europeans cricketers